Bykovo is the name of several inhabited localities in Russia.

Altai Krai
As of 2010, two rural localities in Altai Krai bear this name:
Bykovo, Shelabolikhinsky District, Altai Krai, a selo in Krutishinsky Selsoviet of Shelabolikhinsky District
Bykovo, Shipunovsky District, Altai Krai, a selo in Rossiysky Selsoviet of Shipunovsky District

Arkhangelsk Oblast
As of 2010, two rural localities in Arkhangelsk Oblast bear this name:
Bykovo, Kargopolsky District, Arkhangelsk Oblast, a village in Kalitinsky Selsoviet of Kargopolsky District
Bykovo, Vilegodsky District, Arkhangelsk Oblast, a village in Pavlovsky Selsoviet of Vilegodsky District

Republic of Bashkortostan
As of 2010, one rural locality in the Republic of Bashkortostan bears this name:
Bykovo, Republic of Bashkortostan, a village in Staronadezhdinsky Selsoviet of Blagoveshchensky District

Bryansk Oblast
As of 2010, one rural locality in Bryansk Oblast bears this name:
Bykovo, Bryansk Oblast, a village in Sergeyevsky Selsoviet of Dubrovsky District

Republic of Buryatia
As of 2010, one rural locality in the Republic of Buryatia bears this name:
Bykovo, Republic of Buryatia, a selo in Sherginsky Selsoviet of Kabansky District

Chelyabinsk Oblast
As of 2010, one rural locality in Chelyabinsk Oblast bears this name:
Bykovo, Chelyabinsk Oblast, a village in Krutoyarsky Selsoviet of Oktyabrsky District

Irkutsk Oblast
As of 2010, one rural locality in Irkutsk Oblast bears this name:
Bykovo, Irkutsk Oblast, a settlement in Alarsky District

Ivanovo Oblast
As of 2010, seven rural localities in Ivanovo Oblast bear this name:
Bykovo, Furmanovsky District, Ivanovo Oblast, a village in Furmanovsky District
Bykovo (Ryabovskoye Rural Settlement), Lukhsky District, Ivanovo Oblast, a village in Lukhsky District; municipally, a part of Ryabovskoye Rural Settlement of that district
Bykovo (Porzdnevskoye Rural Settlement), Lukhsky District, Ivanovo Oblast, a village in Lukhsky District; municipally, a part of Porzdnevskoye Rural Settlement of that district
Bykovo, Pestyakovsky District, Ivanovo Oblast, a village in Pestyakovsky District
Bykovo, Puchezhsky District, Ivanovo Oblast, a village in Puchezhsky District
Bykovo, Teykovsky District, Ivanovo Oblast, a village in Teykovsky District
Bykovo, Yuzhsky District, Ivanovo Oblast, a village in Yuzhsky District

Kaluga Oblast
As of 2010, three rural localities in Kaluga Oblast bear this name:
Bykovo, Baryatinsky District, Kaluga Oblast, a village in Baryatinsky District
Bykovo, Kuybyshevsky District, Kaluga Oblast, a village in Kuybyshevsky District
Bykovo, Maloyaroslavetsky District, Kaluga Oblast, a village in Maloyaroslavetsky District

Kirov Oblast
As of 2010, three rural localities in Kirov Oblast bear this name:
Bykovo, Kirov, Kirov Oblast, a village under the administrative jurisdiction of Oktyabrsky City District of the City of Kirov
Bykovo, Kumyonsky District, Kirov Oblast, a selo in Kumensky Rural Okrug of Kumyonsky District
Bykovo, Sovetsky District, Kirov Oblast, a village in Kichminsky Rural Okrug of Sovetsky District

Kostroma Oblast
As of 2010, six rural localities in Kostroma Oblast bear this name:
Bykovo, Antropovsky District, Kostroma Oblast, a village in Kurnovskoye Settlement of Antropovsky District
Bykovo, Krasnoselsky District, Kostroma Oblast, a village in Zakharovskoye Settlement of Krasnoselsky District
Bykovo, Makaryevsky District, Kostroma Oblast, a village in Unzhenskoye Settlement of Makaryevsky District
Bykovo, Ivanovskoye Settlement, Sharyinsky District, Kostroma Oblast, a village in Ivanovskoye Settlement of Sharyinsky District
Bykovo, Ivanovskoye Settlement, Sharyinsky District, Kostroma Oblast, a village in Ivanovskoye Settlement of Sharyinsky District
Bykovo, Troitskoye Settlement, Sharyinsky District, Kostroma Oblast, a village in Troitskoye Settlement of Sharyinsky District

Kursk Oblast
As of 2010, one rural locality in Kursk Oblast bears this name:
Bykovo, Kursk Oblast, a selo in Bykovsky Selsoviet of Gorshechensky District

Leningrad Oblast
As of 2010, one rural locality in Leningrad Oblast bears this name:
Bykovo, Leningrad Oblast, a logging depot settlement in Melnikovskoye Settlement Municipal Formation of Priozersky District

Lipetsk Oblast
As of 2010, one rural locality in Lipetsk Oblast bears this name:
Bykovo, Lipetsk Oblast, a selo in Prechistensky Selsoviet of Izmalkovsky District

Moscow Oblast
As of 2010, nine inhabited localities in Moscow Oblast bear this name.

Urban localities
Bykovo, Ramensky District, Moscow Oblast, a work settlement in Ramensky District

Rural localities
Bykovo, Kulikovskoye Rural Settlement, Dmitrovsky District, Moscow Oblast, a village in Kulikovskoye Rural Settlement of Dmitrovsky District
Bykovo, Dmitrov Town, Dmitrovsky District, Moscow Oblast, a village under the administrative jurisdiction of the Town of Dmitrov, Dmitrovsky District
Bykovo, Lotoshinsky District, Moscow Oblast, a village in Mikulinskoye Rural Settlement of Lotoshinsky District
Bykovo, Pavlovo-Posadsky District, Moscow Oblast, a village in Rakhmanovskoye Rural Settlement of Pavlovo-Posadsky District
Bykovo, Podolsky District, Moscow Oblast, a settlement in Strelkovskoye Rural Settlement of Podolsky District
Bykovo, Vereyskoye Rural Settlement, Ramensky District, Moscow Oblast, a selo in Vereyskoye Rural Settlement of Ramensky District
Bykovo, Sergiyevo-Posadsky District, Moscow Oblast, a village under the administrative jurisdiction of the Town of Khotkovo, Sergiyevo-Posadsky District
Bykovo, Volokolamsky District, Moscow Oblast, a village in Kashinskoye Rural Settlement of Volokolamsky District

Nizhny Novgorod Oblast
As of 2010, five rural localities in Nizhny Novgorod Oblast bear this name:
Bykovo, Bor, Nizhny Novgorod Oblast, a village in Lindovsky Selsoviet of the city of oblast significance of Bor
Bykovo, Koverninsky District, Nizhny Novgorod Oblast, a village in Khokhlomsky Selsoviet of Koverninsky District
Bykovo (selo), Loyminsky Selsoviet, Sokolsky District, Nizhny Novgorod Oblast, a selo in Loyminsky Selsoviet of Sokolsky District
Bykovo (village), Loyminsky Selsoviet, Sokolsky District, Nizhny Novgorod Oblast, a village in Loyminsky Selsoviet of Sokolsky District
Bykovo, Urensky District, Nizhny Novgorod Oblast, a village in Krasnogorsky Selsoviet of Urensky District

Novgorod Oblast
As of 2010, six rural localities in Novgorod Oblast bear this name:
Bykovo, Borovichsky District, Novgorod Oblast, a village in Progresskoye Settlement of Borovichsky District
Bykovo, Lyubytinsky District, Novgorod Oblast, a village under the administrative jurisdiction of  the urban-type settlement of Lyubytino, Lyubytinsky District
Bykovo, Maryovsky District, Novgorod Oblast, a village in Molvotitskoye Settlement of Maryovsky District
Bykovo, Bykovskoye Settlement, Pestovsky District, Novgorod Oblast, a village in Bykovskoye Settlement of Pestovsky District
Bykovo, Vyatskoye Settlement, Pestovsky District, Novgorod Oblast, a village in Vyatskoye Settlement of Pestovsky District
Bykovo, Valdaysky District, Novgorod Oblast, a village in Kostkovskoye Settlement of Valdaysky District

Novosibirsk Oblast
As of 2010, one rural locality in Novosibirsk Oblast bears this name:
Bykovo, Novosibirsk Oblast, a selo in Novosibirsky District

Perm Krai
As of 2010, one rural locality in Perm Krai bears this name:
Bykovo, Perm Krai, a village in Sivinsky District

Pskov Oblast
As of 2010, eleven rural localities in Pskov Oblast bear this name:
Bykovo, Bezhanitsky District, Pskov Oblast, a village in Bezhanitsky District
Bykovo, Dnovsky District, Pskov Oblast, a village in Dnovsky District
Bykovo (Ushchitskaya Rural Settlement), Kunyinsky District, Pskov Oblast, a village in Kunyinsky District; municipally, a part of Ushchitskaya Rural Settlement of that district
Bykovo (Slepnevskaya Rural Settlement), Kunyinsky District, Pskov Oblast, a village in Kunyinsky District; municipally, a part of Slepnevskaya Rural Settlement of that district
Bykovo, Nevelsky District, Pskov Oblast, a village in Nevelsky District
Bykovo, Opochetsky District, Pskov Oblast, a village in Opochetsky District
Bykovo, Plyussky District, Pskov Oblast, a village in Plyussky District
Bykovo, Porkhovsky District, Pskov Oblast, a village in Porkhovsky District
Bykovo, Pushkinogorsky District, Pskov Oblast, a village in Pushkinogorsky District
Bykovo (Zabelskaya Rural Settlement), Pustoshkinsky District, Pskov Oblast, a village in Pustoshkinsky District; municipally, a part of Zabelskaya Rural Settlement of that district
Bykovo (Alolskaya Rural Settlement), Pustoshkinsky District, Pskov Oblast, a village in Pustoshkinsky District; municipally, a part of Alolskaya Rural Settlement of that district

Ryazan Oblast
As of 2010, four rural localities in Ryazan Oblast bear this name:
Bykovo, Belovsky Rural Okrug, Klepikovsky District, Ryazan Oblast, a village in Belovsky Rural Okrug of Klepikovsky District
Bykovo, Gureyevsky Rural Okrug, Klepikovsky District, Ryazan Oblast, a village in Gureyevsky Rural Okrug of Klepikovsky District
Bykovo, Korablinsky District, Ryazan Oblast, a village in Krasnensky Rural Okrug of Korablinsky District
Bykovo, Starozhilovsky District, Ryazan Oblast, a village in Stolpnyansky Rural Okrug of Starozhilovsky District

Smolensk Oblast
As of 2010, eight rural localities in Smolensk Oblast bear this name:
Bykovo, Dorogobuzhsky District, Smolensk Oblast, a village in Balakirevskoye Rural Settlement of Dorogobuzhsky District
Bykovo, Kholm-Zhirkovsky District, Smolensk Oblast, a village in Tomskoye Rural Settlement of Kholm-Zhirkovsky District
Bykovo, Novoduginsky District, Smolensk Oblast, a village in Tesovskoye Rural Settlement of Novoduginsky District
Bykovo, Pochinkovsky District, Smolensk Oblast, a village in Losnenskoye Rural Settlement of Pochinkovsky District
Bykovo, Safonovsky District, Smolensk Oblast, a village in Pushkinskoye Rural Settlement of Safonovsky District
Bykovo, Kasnyanskoye Rural Settlement, Vyazemsky District, Smolensk Oblast, a village in Kasnyanskoye Rural Settlement of Vyazemsky District
Bykovo, Kaydakovskoye Rural Settlement, Vyazemsky District, Smolensk Oblast, a village in Kaydakovskoye Rural Settlement of Vyazemsky District
Bykovo, Novoselskoye Rural Settlement, Vyazemsky District, Smolensk Oblast, a village in Novoselskoye Rural Settlement of Vyazemsky District

Sverdlovsk Oblast
As of 2010, one rural locality in Sverdlovsk Oblast bears this name:
Bykovo, Sverdlovsk Oblast, a selo in Achitsky District

Tomsk Oblast
As of 2010, one rural locality in Tomsk Oblast bears this name:
Bykovo, Tomsk Oblast, a village in Tomsky District

Tver Oblast
As of 2010, fourteen rural localities in Tver Oblast bear this name:
Bykovo, Belsky District, Tver Oblast, a village in Belsky District
Bykovo, Bezhetsky District, Tver Oblast, a village in Bezhetsky District
Bykovo (Kablukovskoye Rural Settlement), Kalininsky District, Tver Oblast, a village in Kalininsky District; municipally, a part of Kablukovskoye Rural Settlement of that district
Bykovo (Verkhnevolzhskoye Rural Settlement), Kalininsky District, Tver Oblast, a village in Kalininsky District; municipally, a part of Verkhnevolzhskoye Rural Settlement of that district
Bykovo, Kalyazinsky District, Tver Oblast, a village in Kalyazinsky District
Bykovo, Kesovogorsky District, Tver Oblast, a village in Kesovogorsky District
Bykovo, Kimrsky District, Tver Oblast, a village in Kimrsky District
Bykovo, Rameshkovsky District, Tver Oblast, a village in Rameshkovsky District
Bykovo (Larionovskoye Rural Settlement), Selizharovsky District, Tver Oblast, a village in Selizharovsky District; municipally, a part of Larionovskoye Rural Settlement of that district
Bykovo (Zakharovskoye Rural Settlement), Selizharovsky District, Tver Oblast, a village in Selizharovsky District; municipally, a part of Zakharovskoye Rural Settlement of that district
Bykovo, Staritsky District, Tver Oblast, a village in Staritsky District
Bykovo, Udomelsky District, Tver Oblast, a village in Udomelsky District
Bykovo, Zapadnodvinsky District, Tver Oblast, a village in Zapadnodvinsky District
Bykovo, Zubtsovsky District, Tver Oblast, a village in Zubtsovsky District

Vladimir Oblast
As of 2010, one rural locality in Vladimir Oblast bears this name:
Bykovo, Vladimir Oblast, a village in Sudogodsky District

Volgograd Oblast
As of 2010, one urban locality in Volgograd Oblast bears this name:
Bykovo, Volgograd Oblast, a work settlement in Bykovsky District

Vologda Oblast
As of 2010, ten rural localities in Vologda Oblast bear this name:
Bykovo, Cherepovetsky District, Vologda Oblast, a village in Myaksinsky Selsoviet of Cherepovetsky District
Bykovo, Gryazovetsky District, Vologda Oblast, a village in Komyansky Selsoviet of Gryazovetsky District
Bykovo, Kharovsky District, Vologda Oblast, a village in Kharovsky Selsoviet of Kharovsky District
Bykovo, Kirillovsky District, Vologda Oblast, a village in Sukhoverkhovsky Selsoviet of Kirillovsky District
Bykovo, Nyuksensky District, Vologda Oblast, a village in Kosmarevsky Selsoviet of Nyuksensky District
Bykovo, Sokolsky District, Vologda Oblast, a village in Zamoshsky Selsoviet of Sokolsky District
Bykovo, Totemsky District, Vologda Oblast, a village in Pogorelovsky Selsoviet of Totemsky District
Bykovo, Velikoustyugsky District, Vologda Oblast, a village in Viktorovsky Selsoviet of Velikoustyugsky District
Bykovo, Vozhegodsky District, Vologda Oblast, a village in Beketovsky Selsoviet of Vozhegodsky District
Bykovo, Vytegorsky District, Vologda Oblast, a village in Megorsky Selsoviet of Vytegorsky District

Yaroslavl Oblast
As of 2010, two rural localities in Yaroslavl Oblast bear this name:
Bykovo, Nekouzsky District, Yaroslavl Oblast, a mestechko in Spassky Rural Okrug of Nekouzsky District
Bykovo, Rybinsky District, Yaroslavl Oblast, a village in Kamennikovsky Rural Okrug of Rybinsky District

Zabaykalsky Krai
As of 2010, one rural locality in Zabaykalsky Krai bears this name:
Bykovo, Zabaykalsky Krai, a selo in Krasnochikoysky District